Pyramids and Stars is the third album, and first live recording, released by the progressive rock group The Tangent. Recorded during the band's first mini-tour, this album is the only live record of the band's original core line-up.

Track listing

References

The Tangent albums
2005 live albums
Inside Out Music live albums